SNF is the global leader in manufacturing polyacrylamides with a capacity of 1190 kt/y (active equivalent). These water-soluble polymers are used as flocculants and coagulants in solid/water separation to recycle water, rheology modifiers and friction reducers. These functionalities have many uses where water is used, in drinking water production, wastewater treatment, mining, paper, enhanced oil recovery, hydraulic fracturing, agriculture, textile and cosmetics.

The SNF Group comprises subsidiaries and joint ventures in over 70 countries and operates 21 production sites in Europe, Americas, Asia and Australia. Its headquarters is located in Andrézieux, France. SNF has customers in over 130 countries and supplies products to a wide variety of industries. SNF is one of the major chemical companies in France.

At the end of 2020, the company employed over 6,600 people for sales of 3.0 G€.

Business Segments 

SNF’s products operate in a variety of markets. The driving factors of SNF’s growth are the scarcity of natural resources: water, oil and minerals.

Drinking water production 

SNF manufactures and supplies organic coagulants such as PolyDADMAC and Polyamines as well as polyacrylamide flocculants and provides the polymer equipment and service required by the drinking water production plant.

Wastewater treatment 

Wastewater treatment is SNF’s historical business. Polyacrylamide flocculants are used in the primary settlers as well as in the sludge dewatering stage. For industrial water treatment, SNF provides heavy metal chelatants, dispersants and scale inhibitors.

Oil 

Polyacrylamides are used in Enhanced Oil Recovery (EOR) to improve the speed and amount of oil extracted from the reservoir. The techniques used to improve oil recovery can be straightforward polymer flooding (PF), surfactant polymer flooding (SP) or alkaline surfactant polymer flooding (ASP). The latter technique, when applicable, has been known to sweep the reservoir of 90% of the oil in place.

Gas (Tight Gas, Shale Gas, Coalbed Methane) 

With the success of hydraulic fracturing, also referred to as slickwater fracturing, as a means of economically recovering unconventional gas reserves, use of polymeric friction reducers has become widespread. Polyacrylamides are used for their drag reducing properties on water to decrease frictional pressure losses, thereby maximizing bottom hole injection pressures allowing for a higher pressure from the same number of pump trucks.

Mining 

In addition to coagulants, flocculants and dispersants, SNF produces also a range of mining reagents based on xanthate chemistry. The following as some of the markets served by SNF in mining and metallurgical applications: slurry solid/liquid separation, pelletization and briquetting, flotation of sulphides ores, reduction of scale deposits, viscosity modifiers for hydraulic transport, mining backfill and grinding, Dust control, environmental remediation and dredging.

Paper 

Widely used by the paper Industry, polyacrylamides sold by SNF under the trademark FLORET are used as processing aids and applied on the wet end of a paper machine either alone or as a part of a multi-component system. They enhance productivity, retention and drainage. Coagulants act as fixative for various chemicals such as dyes and sizing agents, charge neutralization for pitch and cationic demand control. SNF also manufactures synthetic dry strength resins which are acrylamide based, glyoxalated (FLOSTRENGTH)  or issued from Hofmann rearrangement. These resins, applied in the thick stock, imparts higher strength properties to paper & board, allows fiber substitution by lower quality grades or by fillers (PCC, GCC) . Productivity increases have been reported.

Agriculture 

Polyacrylamide superabsorbents can absorb up to 400 times their weight in water, they are used for many applications such as reforestation, horticulture, landscaping and ornamentals. These products sold under the AQUASORB tradename, increase the water holding capacity of soils for several years, reduce irrigation time and water usage, and decrease water and nutrients losses linked to leaching.
Soluble polyacrylamide polymers are used to flocculate the irrigated soil thus improving water penetration and soil aeration while diminishing soil erosion.

Textile 

FLOPRINT textile thickeners are used in pigment, reactive and dispersed printing. They are available as standard inverse emulsions, dewatered inverse emulsions and powders. SNF also manufactures textile auxiliaries used as antimigrants, dispersants, sizing and fixing agents.

Cosmetics 

SNF manufactures three types of cosmetic ingredients, conditioning agents, rheology modifiers and carbomers under the trademarks FLOCARE and FLOGEL. The first, known as Polyquaternium 6, 7, 11 and 22. is used for hair conditioning and body shampoos. They have an affinity for keratin thus protect, enhance and repair the hair fiber. Rheology modifiers are based on inverse emulsion thickening agents for skin care formulations and hair combing creams. Carbomers, based on precipitation technology, are the most widely used thickening agents in the cosmetic industry.

Functional Solutions 

SNF also manufactures specialty polymers such as FLOSET for the construction industry, FLOSPERSE as dispersants, FLOSOFT and FLOGEL in home care applications, METALSORB as heavy metal chelating agents and ODORFLO as odour control agents.

Production 

SNF has always heavily invested in production facilities across the globe, as a result SNF has a total of 21 state-of-the-art production sites in Europe, North and South America, Asia and Australia; with 7 major plants in Andrézieux, France – Riceboro, Georgia, US –  Plaquemine, Louisiana, US – Taixing and Rudong, China – Ulsan, Korea and Vizag, India. In 2020 SNF's worldwide polymer production capacity is 1235 kt/y (active equivalent).

FAQ 

SNF means Société Nouvelle Floerger.

Floerger= flocculent + Schtrechenberger.

Schtrechenberger was the previous company name that owned the Oziol company where M. PICH was working.
After it went bankrupt, M. PICH bought back the company and started in 1978 with 17 employees, stirring polymer in metal drums with wooden sticks.
Société Nouvelle was mandatory when a company was coming from a bankruptcy.  It means “new company”.

References

External links 
 Official website - www.snf.com

Chemical companies of France
French brands
Companies based in Auvergne-Rhône-Alpes